Nicola Beauman (née Mann, born 20 June 1944) is a British biographer and journalist, and the founder of Persephone Books, an independent book publisher based in Bath.

Early life 
Beauman was born in London. She attended St Paul's Girls' School and Newnham College, Cambridge.

Career
Beauman brought attention to middle-class women writers with her 1983 survey A Very Great Profession: The Woman's Novel, 1914–39. Her research showed how literary representations of female domesticity could challenge those social assumptions. Much of Beauman's later writing has been literary biography.

Persephone Books 

Beauman's Persephone Books is a publishing house that mainly publishes female authors. It was founded in 1998 as a mail-order publisher, and sales are mostly made online. In May 2021 the company's retail shop moved from Bloomsbury in London to Bath.

According to The Guardian, Beauman founded Persephone Books to publish 'forgotten' novels by women, many of which she had written about in, A Very Great Profession: The Woman's Novel 1914-39, originally published by Virago in 1983 and reissued in 2008 by Persephone Books. The books all come in a uniform grey cover, which Beauman sees as 'a guarantee of a good read', and contain endpapers that use patterns or prints from the year the book was first published.

In an interview with journalist Leonie Cooper, Beauman said that when she first started the press things were hard: "We had a lot of books piling up in the warehouse, but then we got a bestseller, which was phenomenally lucky."  That bestseller was Miss Pettigrew Lives for a Day by Winifred Watson, which Persephone Books published in 2000. Since then Persephone Books has continued to publish several books a year, and currently has 139 titles in print, including novels by Dorothy Whipple, Virginia Woolf, R. C. Sherriff, Katherine Mansfield, and E. M. Delafield.

Publications 
 A Very Great Profession: The Woman's Novel, 1914–39, Virago (London), 1983.
 Cynthia Asquith (biography), Hamilton (London), 1987.
 Morgan: A Biography of the Novelist E. M. Forster, Hodder and Stoughton (London), 1993, Knopf (New York), 1994.
 The Other Elizabeth Taylor, Persephone (London, England), 1993.

References 

1944 births
British women writers
Living people
British biographers
Women biographers